Lydon J. Murtha (born November 13, 1985) is a former American football offensive tackle. He was drafted by the Detroit Lions in the seventh round of the 2009 NFL Draft. He played college football at Nebraska.

Professional career
Murtha was signed off the Lions practice squad by the Miami Dolphins in October 2009.  He was placed on injured reserve after the 2011 preseason with an undisclosed injury.

Notes

External links

Detroit Lions bio
Nebraska Cornhuskers bio

1985 births
Living people
People from Homestead, Florida
Players of American football from Florida
American football offensive tackles
Nebraska Cornhuskers football players
Detroit Lions players
Miami Dolphins players
Sportspeople from Miami-Dade County, Florida
People from Hutchinson, Minnesota